Himalayan Blunder was an extremely controversial war memoir penned by Brigadier John Dalvi. It dealt with the causes, consequences and aftermath of the Sino-Indian War of 1962, that ended in Chinese People's Liberation Army inflicting a defeat on India.

The title seems to allude to the "Himalayan miscalculation" that Gandhi discusses in his autobiographical article for 14 April 1919, and which retained this title as Chapter 33 in Gandhi's autobiography.

Brigadier Dalvi served in the Indian Army and gives a first-person account of the war. The book was banned by the Indian Government after its publication.

Because of the book, the term "Himalayan blunder" came to be used as a synonym for colossal failure in the context of Indian politics.

Synopsis 
The book begins with the narration of Brig. Dalvi's days in the DSSC, Wellington. He narrates an incident where a guest faculty, a retired British official, after hearing that Nehru had signed Panchsheel agreement with China in April 1954 and had decided to give up the post in Tibet that the British had maintained in Tibet to check Chinese advance, interrupted his class and warned that India and China would soon be at war and people in this class would be fighting it. Brig. Dalvi remembers that he was very angry with the gentleman questioning the authority of the leader of his country.

Brig. Dalvi also examines the position of Tibet vis-a-vis India and China. The British, he says, had insight into China's imperial ambitions. They had therefore cultivated Tibet as a buffer state. Expectedly, the Chinese attacked Tibet in 1950 and captured it. India did not protest the attack owing to Nehru's China-friendly policy. The Chinese began constructing roads from Tibet leading to Aksai Chin near Ladakh. The Chinese had two major claims with respect to Indian territories -

1) Aksai Chin in the northeastern section of Ladakh in Kashmir.

2) British-designated North-East Frontier Agency (NEFA), which is the present-day state of Arunachal Pradesh.
3) Indian involvement

The War 
When the war broke out on 8 September 1962, Nehru was away from India. The Chinese attacked simultaneously on the Ladakh area and NEFA. They managed to capture 11,000 km2 of area in Aksai Chin and substantial area in NEFA. The  commander of IV Corps, General B.M. Kaul was not on the front lines and was in Military Hospital, Delhi, recovering from an illness. Dalvi further alleges that B.M. Kaul was promoted to the position of General supplanting more capable, and senior officers because he was personally close to Nehru.

According to Dalvi, the Indian Army lacked leadership, equipment for mountain warfare, weaponry, and basic essentials like warm clothing, snow boots, and glasses. Brig Dalvi lavishes praise on his brigade's courage, bravery, and grit in face of superior opposition. Despite gaining territory, the Chinese army declared a unilateral ceasefire, while still maintaining the status quo. Brig. Dalvi was taken as prisoner of war along with the soldiers of his brigade. He was subsequently imprisoned for six months. Dalvi also records how China had meticulously planned the attack while officially it maintained a different posture.

Dalvi also examines the aftermath of the war. The detractors of Prime Minister Pandit Jawaharlal Nehru held Defence Minister Krishna Menon and General Brij Mohan Kaul responsible for the debacle and both of them resigned.

Mr. Ravi Belagere, a Kannada journalist, has translated Himalayan Blunder into Kannada. The translated Kannada version has allowed Indian readers to read more about causes for the defeat of the Indian army against China.

Editions
Editions that have been published include:
 (506 pages)
 (506 pages)
 (506 pages)
 (506 pages)

References

Censorship in India
History books about India
Sino-Indian War
Books about the Himalayas
1968 non-fiction books
Indian non-fiction books
Military memoirs
Censored books
20th-century Indian books